Violet Naylor-Leyland is a British fashion stylist, journalist and author.

Early life
She is the daughter of Philip Naylor-Leyland and Lady Isabella Lambton, and the granddaughter of Antony Lambton.

Career
Naylor-Leyland has written for publications including Vanity Fair, Tatler, Evening Standard, The Lady, and Bloomberg Businessweek.

In 2022, she published Rare Birds, True Style: Extraordinary Interiors and Signature Looks, with photography by Andrew Farrar.

Personal life
In 2012, she married Charles Delacherois-Day.

Publications
Rare Birds, True Style: Extraordinary Interiors and Signature Looks, Rizzoli, 2022

References

Living people
Fashion stylists
British journalists
British non-fiction writers
Year of birth missing (living people)